The 2013–14 Hartford Hawks men's basketball team  represented the University of Hartford during the 2013–14 NCAA Division I men's basketball season. The Hawks, led by fourth year head coach John Gallagher, played their home games at the Chase Arena at Reich Family Pavilion and were members of the America East Conference. They finished the season 17–16, 10–6 in America East play to finish in third place. They advanced to the semifinals of the America East Conference tournament where they lost to Stony Brook.

Roster

Schedule

|-
!colspan=9 style=| Non-conference regular season

|-
!colspan=9 style=| America East Men's tournament

References

Hartford Hawks men's basketball seasons
Hartford
Hartford Hawks
Hartford Hawks